Pyrausta genialis is a moth in the family Crambidae. It was described by South in 1901. It is found in China.

Subspecies
Pyrausta genialis genialis
Pyrausta genialis reductalis Caradja in Caradja & Meyrick, 1937 (China: Yunnan)

References

Moths described in 1901
generosa
Moths of Asia